Baba Ana is a commune in Prahova County, Muntenia, Romania. It is composed of five villages: Baba Ana, Cireșanu, Conduratu, Crângurile, and Satu Nou.

The commune lies in the Wallachian Plain, on the banks of the river Ghighiu.

The national road DN1B, which runs from Ploiești to Buzău via Mizil, passes close to the northern side of the commune. The A7 motorway (currently under construction) will have an exit at Cireșanu.

References

Baba Ana
Localities in Muntenia